The pollination of orchids is an extremely complex chapter in the biology of this family of plants that are distinguished, above all other angiosperms, by the complexity of their flowers and by the intricate ecological interactions with their pollinator agents. It is a subject that has captured the attention of numerous scientists over time, including Charles Darwin, father of the theory of evolution by natural selection, who made the first observations about the fundamental role of insects in orchid pollination, which were published in 1862 in his book The Fertilization of Orchids. In fact, Darwin was not exaggerating when he claimed that the varied stratagems orchids use to attract their pollinators transcend the imagination of any human being.

Adaptations of orchids to pollination by animals 
97% of species of orchids need a pollinator for the transfer of pollen grains from one plant to the pistils of another individual to take place, and thus for fertilization and seeds formation to occur. The pollen of orchids is grouped in compact masses called pollinia (singular: "pollinium"), so that by itself or by wind action the pollen cannot disperse from one flower to another, so pollinators are essential to ensure their sexual reproduction. These pollinators are very varied and, depending on the species in question, may be flies, mosquitos, bees, wings, butterflies, coleopterans, and birds (especially hummingbirds).

The zoophily that characterizes orchids presupposes that pollinating animals visit the flowers regularly and stop at them long enough; that they brush or touch the anthers and stigma with some frequency and that the pollen remains attached to the visitors so perfectly that it can reach with due safety the stigmas of other flowers. The result of zoophily depends essentially on the animals being able to recognize flowers from a certain distance and being attracted to flowers of the same species. Zoophilous flowers, then, must possess "attractive products" (baits, such as pollen and nectar), "means of attraction" (such as scents and colors) and, in addition, viscous or adherent pollen.

In the course of the evolution of angiosperms, there has been a very intense differentiation of the means of attraction and claim, as well as of the shape of the flower; thanks to this, an increasing number of animals have been able to collaborate in pollination. In the course of evolution, the casual visit of flowers by various animals has progressively led to the establishment of close relationships between pollinating animals and zoophilous flowers, with obvious advantages for both groups. For plants, this implied an increasing precision in the attraction of only certain visitors and a transfer of pollen to the stigmas of other plants, which led to a progressive saving in the production of pollen. In fact, the ratio between the number of pollen grains and the number of ovules produced by a flower is of the order of one million for anemophilous plants, while in orchids it is one. For specialized pollinating animals, competition with other anthophilous animals decreased, and targeted or specialized pollination in a single species became ultimately advantageous for them.

The evolutionary development of zoophilous angiosperms and of the groups of animals that have been adapting to them can only be understood as a coevolution conditioned by reciprocal relationships. The adaptation of orchids and their pollinators to each other has sometimes gone so far that they cannot exist without each other. Pollination mechanisms are the fruit of such co-evolution. In general, such mechanisms are beneficial to both parties: the pollinating agent obtains nectar from the orchids' flower and the orchids in turn benefit from the transfer of pollen from one flower to another. However, in many cases the attraction of pollinators to orchids is due to deception and does not involve a reward.

Orchid flowers 

Orchid flowers are generally hermaphrodites, rarely unisexual, and usually zygomorphics — that is, bilaterally symmetrical. In the vast majority of genera, the flowers consist of three outer elements called sepals, two lateral and one dorsal, and three inner elements called petals, the lower one modified into a lip or labellum, larger in size and more intensely colored than the others. The labellum is often trilobed, or unusually shaped, with fleshy bumps or ridges or with a basal spur, and often with a totally different color arrangement than the other two petals.

The androecium usually presents one or two stamens, sometimes three, and is attached to the style and stigma, forming the column also called gynostema or gynostegium. The pollen is grouped in a number of masses of varying hardness, called pollinia, which can be between one and twelve, but usually two or four. The pollinia form, together with a sticky stalk derived from the anther or stigma, the pollinium, the transport unit during pollination. The gynoecium is formed by three united carpels and is infertile—it develops below the calyx. The style and stigma are highly modified. The style is solitary and terminal and is the main component of the column. Near the apex is a portion of the stigma in the form of an elongated lobe usually non-receptive, called the rostellum, positioned above the stigmatic region. A portion of the rostellum may form a sticky platform, called the viscidium, attached to the pollinium stem.

They are generally nectar-producing, as a reward to pollinators. The nectaries are variable in position and type. For example, they are found on a lip spur, or on the apices of the sepals, or on the septa of the gynoecium. Some orchid species are self-pollinatings or apomictics, i.e., they do not need pollinators to produce seeds.

Attraction of pollinators by means of rewards 
Many orchid species reward pollinators with food, such as nectar, food hairs or oils, and other compounds, such as waxes, resins and fragrances. These rewards, in turn, reinforce pollinator behavior. However, specialization on a single type of pollinator to ensure a more efficient transfer of pollen determined an increasing morphological and structural specialization in orchid flowers to ensure the attraction of a single insect species.

This central point in the evolution of interspecific relationships between orchids and their pollinators was captured by Darwin in studying British and some exotic species of this family. For example, the Madagascar species Angraecum sesquipedale has on its flower a spur of more than 30 cm whose bottom fills with nectar. Darwin tried unsuccessfully to remove the pollinia from the flower using needles. He was only able to do so after inserting a cylinder with a diameter of 2.5 mm to the bottom of the spur and pulling it out again, since at that point the viscid remained attached to the cylinder. Darwin reasoned that when a butterfly reached the bottom of the spur with its trunk to release nectar, the pollinia would remain attached to its head once it withdrew its proboscis. Upon visiting the next flower, the butterfly would pollinate it by depositing the pollinia on its stigma. According to this reasoning, the pollinating insect of Angraecum sesquipedale should be a butterfly with a spiritromere more than 30 cm long, an idea that sounded ridiculous to biologists of the time. However, Darwin's prediction could be verified in 1903, when the moth Xanthopan morganii praedicta was discovered in Madagascar, with a spirorhomb of that size. The subspecific epithet predicta refers to its existence having been predicted by Darwin.

The butterfly is attracted to the flower by its fragrance, especially at night. When it approaches the flower, it unrolls its proboscis and inserts it into a crevice of the rostellum leading to the spur. Once it has finished releasing nectar from the base of the spur, it lifts its head while removing the proboscis from the spur. When it performs that movement, the viscid attaches to its head or another part of its body. The viscid contains a small pedicel (the caudicle) that carries the pollinia at its end. When the butterfly finishes winding its proboscis and flies to another flower, the caudicle dehydrates and when it dries, its angle with respect to the insect's body is modified, so that when the insect visits the next flower and inserts its proboscis into it, the pollinia will be facing each other, and subsequently attached to the stigma. Once pollination has occurred, the flowers cease to produce fragrance and their tepals wither shortly thereafter. However, the process of pollen transfer, fertilization and the formation of thousands of new individuals has already been assured.

Many orchids, such as the case of Angraecum sesquipedale, are pollinated by nocturnal butterflies and, for that reason, present light-colored, almost white flowers and produce fragrance during the evening or night. Examples of this type of orchids are the species Bonatea speciosa, Habenaria epipactidea, the genus Satyrium, Disa cooperi and D. ophrydea. Pollination by diurnal butterflies, on the other hand, has evolved in several orchid genera. The flowers of these species display brilliant colors and reward their pollinators with nectar.

Species pollinated by bees (called melitophilous) often emit a strong fragrance during the day and are strong and brightly colored. Examples of these orchids are Satyrium erectum and Disa versicolor. The different species of bees that pollinate orchids receive not only nectar but also oils in many cases. This reward — a rather rare phenomenon in plants — is known for several dozen orchid species, including some 55 South African species, and the bees use it to feed their larvae. The genera Disperis, Pterygodium, Corycium, Ceratandra, Evotella, Satyrium and Pachites, among others, feature species that reward their pollinators with oils.

Pollination by flies (myophily) is the second most common method among orchids, with pollinators belonging to twenty dipteran families. The flowers emit scents that resemble decaying organic materials, excrement or carrion, substrates visited by flies in search of food or to deposit their eggs. Different floral parts produce putrescent or carrion odors and form traps that retain the pollinator, as well as possessing various appendages that attract them and colors either bright or resembling flesh or some other tinge of rotting matter. For flowers of daciniphilous Bulbophyllum species that attract true fruit flies belonging to tribe Dacini (Tephritidae: Diptera) via pleasant/spicy attractant(s) (as floral synomone) to establish true mutualisms, where both organisms gain reproductive benefits, between the orchids and the male flies - please see link:

The flowers of Stelis hymenantha, for example, give off an intense aroma of sweet menthol. At the base of the labellum a substance is produced that adheres strongly to its surface, like a film, similar to nectar. The flowers of S. immersa, another orchid pollinated by dipterans, are also fragrant, but with a different, melon-like scent; and unlike the former, the sticky substance is located both on the petals and at the base of the labellum. Visitors to these two species are mainly dipterans of several families. Most flies usually remain outside the flower examining the slimy liquid on the outer surface of the petals. The pollinators on Stelis immersa are females of a small fly of the genus Megaselia (Phoridae), which is the only one with the precise size to effect pollen transfer. After examining the nectar-like substance, the insect enters the flower laterally and lands on the labellum, which is in the downward-facing position. When this happens, the labellum rises, pressing the insect against the pollinium viscid and trapping it. To exit, the fly backs up and the viscid adheres to its thorax. The labellum returns to its original position freeing the animal.

Attraction and reward by means of perfumes 
The flowers of the species of the subtribes Stanhopeinae and Catasetinae belong to the most fascinating and extravagant of all orchids. They are not among the most beautiful, but due to their very particular pollination they have sometimes created unique flowers with very strange pollination mechanisms. The species of these tribes are pollinated exclusively by males of the euglosinae that look for and collect perfumes in these flowers; the reason for this behavior is unknown, since perfumes do not provide nutrition or protection, but it is thought that they may be related to the mating rituals of these insects.

The way to collect these scents is always very similar. The male approaches the source of the scent, the osmophore; he usually perches on the labellum and begins to collect with the long dense hairs of the front legs the substances responsible for the scent. In most cases they are liquid; in some species in crystalline form. If they are solid, the male first dissolves them with secretions from his salivary glands. When the aromatic components saturate the bee's legs, the bee leaves the flower to transfer the aromas with the help of the middle legs to cavities in the hind legs, where the substances can be preserved for a long time. Different orchid genera attach the polliniums to different parts of the body of these pollinators.

Orchids, like other plants, selectively attract a specific group of euglossine males by producing species-specific scent mixtures that apparently act as reproductive isolation mechanisms. Some orchids even present morphological modifications in their flowers in such a way that they only release pollinium when visited by certain species of bees according to their size and behavior. For this reason, not all euglossines that visit an orchid species are effective pollinators of it.

Some Bulbophyllum species exclusively attract a group of Dacini fruit fly males as potential pollinators via specific male attractants e.g. methyl eugenol (ME), raspberry ketone (RK) or zingerone (ZN). Methyl eugenol is a sex pheromone precursor for many quarantine pest species of Bactrocera e.g. the oriental fruit fly, B. dorsalis, B. carambolae, B. occipitalis and B. umbrosa. Raspberry ketone or zigerone is incorporated as a sex pheromone component for males, namely - Zeugodacus caudatus, Z. cucurbitae and Z. tau.

Attraction of pollinators by means of deception 

Many orchids have resorted to the tactic of seducing pollinators by offering scents, shapes, colors or movements that mimic something they are interested in without offering anything in return. The mechanisms of deception are as varied as they are surprising and are listed below:

 generalized feeding deception: flowers mimic the shape and coloring of species that usually reward pollinators.
 feeding deception mediated through floral mimicry: In this case, flowers exactly mimic a particular species that rewards pollinators and with which they cohabit.
 mimicry of nesting sites: flowers mimic egg-laying sites of pollinators.
 mimicking shelter sites: flowers provide pollinators with sites for shelter. This strategy may not be deceptive, but favorable to both the insect and the orchid.
 pseudo-antagonism: the plant attracts pollinators through the invocation of innate defense mechanisms. Thus, it mimics the form of another insect species, for example, which the pollinator wishes to drive away or kill. The pollinator, seeing its supposed enemy, attacks it, again and again. In this futile fight against a flower, the insect covers itself with pollen that it will distribute to other flowers when it is fooled again.
 rendezvous attraction: flowers mimic other flowers that are attractive to female pollinators.
 sexual deception: in this case, flowers mimic the mating signals (both visual and olfactory) of female pollinators.

Of the mechanisms described, the common one among orchids is widespread feeding deception (reported in 38 genera) followed by sexual deception (18 genera).

Attraction of pollinators by luring them for food 
The ability to attract pollinators without offering them any reward in return has evolved independently in several angiosperm lineages, but usually in only a few species per family. In contrast, it has been estimated that about one-third of orchid species use the food-deceptive mechanism. This mechanism involves attracting pollinators by signaling the presence of food, such as nectar or pollen, but without providing them with any reward. To do this, orchids use the strategy of resembling species that do reward their pollinators and with which they cohabit. Most often, feeding deception consists of a general resemblance to species that reward pollinators, i.e., this type of orchid features large, brightly colored flowers, a strategy that exploits pollinators' innate preferences for that class of flowers.

Imitation of other plants 
In this case the orchid "tricks" pollinators typical of other plant species into pollinating. The method of tricking them is to mimic the flowers of other species.  A very descriptive case of this is observed in the orchid Epidendrum ibaguense. This terrestrial or lithophilous orchid is abundant from Mexico to Bolivia and Brazil. Its orange flowers with intense yellow labellum mimic the flowers of an asclepiadaceae, Asclepias curassavica. There is a butterfly, Agraulis vanillae, which usually visits this species to procure nectar in exchange for pollen transport. On many occasions, however, the butterfly, attracted by the color and shape of the flowers of Epidendrum, goes towards them and inserts its mouthparts (proboscis) in a narrow duct (gynostemium) which, due to its very small diameter, causes the spirtromere to be trapped for a few moments.  The insect's struggle to free itself causes the orchid's pollinia to adhere to its head. After being released, and being tricked again by another Epidendrum plant, it will transport pollen and thus allow pollination in this species but without having received nectar for its services.

Attraction of pollinators by sexual luring 

There are deceptive flowers that mimic the shape, hairiness and smell of the females of certain wasps or bees. The best known case is the Ophrys insectifera orchid of southern Europe; it is visited only by two species of wasps of the genus Argogorytes. Males are born in spring several weeks before females, and in their first flights are attracted by the fragrance of Ophrys flowers, similar to the pheromones secreted by females. In addition, the labellum is similar in shape, color and texture to the females. The process is designated pseudocopulation because male wasps attempt to mate with the flower, and in doing so, come into contact with the anther, transferring pollinia from one flower to another in successive attempts.

Pollination by pseudocopulation was first described in 1916 and 1917 by A. Pouyanne and H. Correvon when they studied the interrelationships between the orchid Ophrys speculum and the scoliidae wasp Campsoscolia ciliata in Algeria. The publications of these French biologists went unnoticed until Robert Godfrey confirmed their observations in 1925, which determined an increase in interest in the subject. The 1925 paper was followed by a large number of publications by Australian biologist Edith Coleman on the pollination of orchids of the genus Cryptostylis by males of the ichneumonoidea wasp Lissopimpla excelsa.

Several genera of terrestrial orchids reproduce by this mechanism. The best known and best documented genera are, in addition to the already mentioned Ophrys and Cryptostylis, Drakaea, Caladenia, Chiloglottis, Geoblasta, Arthrochilus, Calochilus, Leporella and Spiculaea. The vast majority of terrestrial orchid genera using pseudocopulation are found in Australia and the largest genus of orchids with pseudocopulate species is Ophrys from Europe. The mechanism is by no means circumscribed to a particular continent, as it has also been reported for a South American species (Geoblasta penicillata) and two South African orchids of the genus Disa.

Identical mechanism uses Tolumnia henekenii, whose flower resembles the female of a species of bee, Centris insularis, and does so well that the male of this species is deceived and tries to copulate the female imitation offered by the flower. In doing so he pollinates the flower.

In Caleana, called in English-speaking countries duck orchid because of the resemblance of its labellum to the head of a duck and the rest of the flower to the body of a duck in full flight, a somewhat different mechanism of pseudocopulation has been described. This species uses a spring mechanism to trap the insects in a pouch, their only possibility of escape being through the pollinium and stigma. Male pollinating insects land on the labellum, which triggers a two-hinged relaxation mechanism (one is the labellum-lamellum and the other is the lamina-perianth) that flips the insect with the back of its thorax into the pouch containing the stigma and pollinia.

Pseudocopulation is not only restricted to pollinators belonging to the Hymenoptera order (bees and wasps). In fact, it has also been described for Diptera (a mosquito of the genus Bradysia) that pseudocopulate species of Lepanthes, one of the largest genera of angiosperms inhabiting neotropical rainforests.

The flowers of orchids of the genus Ophrys not only mimic the shape, size and color of the females of their pollinators, but also emit a fragrance that includes several compounds found in the sex pheromones of the females, thereby reinforcing the sexual behavior of the males. The volatile compounds emitted by Ophrys iricolor and the female pheromones of its pollinator species, Andrena morio, have been compared both chemically and electrophysiologically. More than 40 compounds have been discovered, including alkanes and alkenes with 20 to 29 carbon atoms, aldehydes with 9 to 24 carbons and two esteres. Almost all of these compounds were found in similar proportions in both O. iricolor floral extracts and extracts from the cuticular surface of A. morio females.

The biologically active volatile compounds of this rootstock are very similar to those used by other Ophrys species that are pseudocopulated by males of the genera Andrena and Colletes.

See also 

 Orchidaceae
 Orchis
 Distribution of orchid species

Notes

References 

Orchids
Pollination
Botany
Flowers
Charles Darwin